Doug Neely is a retired American soccer defender who had an extensive career in several American indoor leagues including the original Major Indoor Soccer League, Continental Indoor Soccer League and National Professional Soccer League.

Youth
In 1983, Neely graduated from Canyon High School where he was the 1983 Los Angeles Times High School Player of the Year.  He attended the San Diego State University, playing on the men's soccer team in 1983 and 1984.  Following his sophomore season, he transferred to Chapman University where he finished his collegiate career.  Chapman inducted Neely into the school's Athletic Hall of Fame in 2007.

Professional
In 1987, Neely attended an open tryout with the Los Angeles Lazers of the Major Indoor Soccer League.  He played well enough to earn a reserve contract.  He then worked himself into the first team where he remained for two seasons.  When the Lazers folded in 1989, the Kansas City Comets selected Neely in the dispersal draft.  The Comets folded in 1991 and Neely signed with the Baltimore Blast on August 27, 1991.  The Blast folded in 1992 and Neely moved to the Baltimore Spirit of the National Professional Soccer League.  He played two seasons with the Spirit.  In the summer of 1993, Neely also played for the Los Angeles United in the Continental Indoor Soccer League.  In 1994, he joined the Anaheim Splash of the CISL and would play for them for the next four summer seasons.  On October 26, 1996, Neely returned to the Baltimore Spirit.
On February 1, 1998, the New England Revolution selected Neely in the second round (seventeenth overall) of the 1998 MLS Supplemental Draft.  Neely chose to pursue his MBA, electing not to report to the Revolution. The Revolution released him in the pre-season.  In the fall of 1998, Neely signed with the Baltimore Blast of the NPSL and played four seasons before retiring.   Neely was inducted into the Baltimore Blast Hall of Fame in 2010.

After retiring, Neely began Coastal Printing Solutions, a printing company in Newport Beach, California.

References

External links
 Making a Steady Splash: Neely Gets Results, Not Fame, With His Consistent Play on Defense
 MISL: Doug Neely

Living people
1965 births
American soccer players
Anaheim Splash players
Baltimore Blast (NPSL) players
Baltimore Blast (1980–1992) players
Baltimore Spirit players
Kansas City Comets (original MISL) players
Los Angeles Lazers players
Major Indoor Soccer League (1978–1992) players
Major Indoor Soccer League (2001–2008) players
National Professional Soccer League (1984–2001) players
San Diego State Aztecs men's soccer players
Soccer players from California
New England Revolution draft picks
Association football defenders